Vikraman Balaji is an Indian mathematician and currently a professor  at Chennai Mathematical Institute. He completed his doctorate in Mathematics under the supervision of C. S. Seshadri. His primary area of research is in algebraic geometry, representation theory and differential geometry. Balaji was awarded the 2006 Shanti Swarup Bhatnagar Award in Mathematical Sciences along with Indranil Biswas "for his outstanding contributions to moduli problems of principal bundles over algebraic varieties, in particular on the Uhlenbeck-Yau compactification of the Moduli Spaces of µ-semistable bundles."
He was elected Fellow of the Indian Academy of Sciences in 2007, Fellow of the Indian National Science Academy in 2015 and was awarded the J.C. Bose National Fellowship from 2009.

Selected publications

Notes

External links
 CSIR R&D Highlights
 2006 Bhatnagar Awards
 

20th-century Indian mathematicians
Living people
Fellows of the Indian Academy of Sciences
Fellows of the Indian National Science Academy
Year of birth missing (living people)
Recipients of the Shanti Swarup Bhatnagar Award in Mathematical Science